Aegopinella epipedostoma is a species of small land snail, a terrestrial pulmonate gastropod mollusk in the family Gastrodontidae, the glass snails.

Subspecies
 Aegopinella epipedostoma epipedostoma (Fagot, 1879)
 Aegopinella epipedostoma iuncta Hudec, 1964

Distribution 
This species occurs in the Czech Republic, Ukraine and other countries.

References

 Kerney, M.P., Cameron, R.A.D. & Jungbluth, J-H. (1983). Die Landschnecken Nord- und Mitteleuropas. Ein Bestimmungsbuch für Biologen und Naturfreunde, 384 pp., 24 plates. [Summer or later]. Hamburg / Berlin (Paul Parey).
 Sysoev, A. V. & Schileyko, A. A. (2009). Land snails and slugs of Russia and adjacent countries. Sofia/Moskva (Pensoft). 312 pp., 142 plates. [June] [= Pensoft Series Faunistica No 87].
 Bank, R. A.; Neubert, E. (2017). Checklist of the land and freshwater Gastropoda of Europe. Last update: July 16, 2017

Gastrodontidae
Gastropods described in 1879